The Unknown Singer (French: Le chanteur inconnu) is a 1947 French drama film directed by André Cayatte and starring Tino Rossi,  Lilia Vetti and Maria Mauban. It is a remake of the 1931 film of the same title.

The film's sets were designed by the art directors Léon Barsacq and Robert-Jules Garnier.

Cast
 Tino Rossi as Julien Mortal / Paolo  
 Lilia Vetti as Louise  
 Maria Mauban as Renée 
 Charles Dechamps as Max Daroult, le directeur de la radio  
 Raymond Bussières as Fernand, Juliens Manager  
 Lucien Nat as Carray Mas  
 Madeleine Suffel as La bonne  
 Jacqueline Dumonceau as La journaliste 
 Erico Braga as L'aubergiste 
 Lucien Callamand as Le régisseur  
 Marcel Carpentier as La basse  
 Espanita Cortez 
 Albert Duvaleix as Le marchand de disques  
 Gustave Gallet as Le directeur de l'opéra  
 Marie Guilhène 
 Suzanne Guémard as Une dame  
 Pierre Labry as Le machiniste  
 Ray Postiaux as La vendeuse  
 Marcelle Rexiane as La tante  
 Jean-Marc Tennberg

References

Bibliography 
 Hugh Dauncey. Popular Music in France from Chanson to Techno. Routledge, 2017.

External links 
 

1947 films
French drama films
1947 drama films
1940s French-language films
Films directed by André Cayatte
French black-and-white films
1940s French films